Jamie Reid (born 1947) is an English artist.

Jamie Reid may also refer to:
Jamie Reid (poet) (1941–2015), Canadian poet, writer, and arts organizer/activist
Jamie Reid (footballer, born July 1994), English-Northern Irish footballer for Stevenage
Jamie Reid (footballer, born January 1994), Scottish footballer
Jamie Reid (swimmer) (born 1983), American backstroke swimmer

See also
James Reid (disambiguation)
Jamie Reed (disambiguation)